is a Japanese guitarist, music producer, narrator, former idol and actor. In the 80's, he was part of the idol group Tanokin Trio. He released a single called "kimagure ONE-WAY BOY" in 1983 as lead vocalist and guitarist of THE GOOD-BYE.

Major casting works

Television
Kinpachi-sensei (TBS)
The first series (26 October 1979 – 28 March 1980)
Special 1 (October 8, 1982)
Special 3 (October 5, 1984)
Special 5 (1986)
Special 6 (1987)
Special 9 (1998)
Tadaima Hokago (ただいま放課後) (May 26 – September 19, 1980, Fuji TV)
お化けのサンバ (1980, TV Tokyo)
幕末花の美剣士たち (January 4, 1981, TV Tokyo)
サザエさん (1981–1982, Fuji TV)
大河ドラマ「峠の群像」 (1982, NHK)
ボクの音楽武者修行 (1982, TV Asahi)
少年刑務所-母と子の遠い道程 (1982, ytv)
セーラー服通り (1986, TBS)
銀河テレビ小説「はねっかえり純情派」 (1987, NHK)
ハロー!グッバイ 第13話「女が刑事になる時」 (1989, NTV)
世にも奇妙な物語「廃校七番目の不思議」 (February 14, 1991)

Film
Third-Year High School Boys (December 18, 1982)
Toshi in Takarazuka: Love Forever (August 4, 1983)
Kamen Rider Agito: Project G4 (2001) (Voice appearance (as a member of RIDER CHIPS))
Kamen Rider Blade: Missing Ace (2004) (Male role playing in Hakaranda (as a member of RIDER CHIPS))

Tanokin Super Hit Series
Graffiti Youth: Sneaker Blues (February 11, 1981)
Blue Jeans Memory (July 11, 1981)
Good Luck Love (Guddo rakku love) (December 20, 1981)
Highteen Boogie (August 7, 1982)
The Mysterious Gemini • Y&S (December 11, 1982)
Heart Beat (August 4, 1983)

References

External links 
 Nomura Yoshio

Japanese idols
Johnny & Associates
1964 births
Living people
20th-century Japanese male actors